All Saints Church is a mediaeval church in the suburban village of Allesley adjoining the City of Coventry, in the West Midlands of England. The building is grade I listed, though churches in ecclesiastical use are exempt from listed building procedures.

The church is thought to be 13th century in origin, but has a history dating back to Norman times and was largely rebuilt in 1862–3 by James Murray. The building contains many wall monuments, dating to the 17th and 18th centuries, particularly in the vestry and under the tower. Further additions were made in the 19th century.

References 

Churches in Coventry
Grade I listed churches in the West Midlands (county)
Allesley